Sphenoid may refer to:
 Sphenoid bone, a bone in anatomy
 Sphenoid (geometry), a tetrahedron with 2-fold mirror or rotation symmetry